Nava is one of the 38 municipalities of Coahuila, in north-eastern Mexico. The municipal seat lies at Nava. The municipality covers an area of 804.9 km².

Towns and villages

The largest localities (cities, towns, and villages) are:

Adjacent municipalities

 Guerrero Municipality - east and southeast
 Villa Unión Municipality - southwest
 Zaragoza Municipality - northwest
 Piedras Negras Municipality - north

References

Municipalities of Coahuila